The Upper Weser Valley in central Germany has been formed by the Upper Weser river cutting through the Weser Uplands for around  between the towns of Hann. Münden and Minden. It lies in the German federal states of Lower Saxony, Hesse and North Rhine-Westphalia.

Course 
The Upper Weser Valley begins near Hann. Münden, where the rivers Werra and Fulda join to form the  Weser and follows the course of the Upper Weser northwards through the Weser Uplands to Bodenwerder, then continues in a northwestern direction, south of the Süntel hills and the Weser Hills, and ends finally at the great gap of Porta Westfalica, where the Weser breaks through the Wiehen and Weser Hills out into the North German Plain. In the south the Upper Weser Valley crosses the Solling-Vogler Nature Park and, in the north, the Weser Uplands Schaumburg-Hamelin Nature Park. 

At its northern end, the Upper Weser Valley is followed by the Middle Weser Valley, part of the Middle Weser Region.

Hills 
The Upper Weser Valley is bordered by the following uplands (from south to north):

Towns 
The towns of the Upper Weser Valley are Hann. Münden, Bad Karlshafen, Beverungen, Höxter, Holzminden, Bodenwerder, Hameln, Rinteln, Vlotho, Bad Oeynhausen and Porta Westfalica.

Culture and Infrastructure 
The Upper Weser Valley has is agriculturally and culturally important.

Several tourist routes accompany the Weser Valley: The German Fairy Tale Route, the Weser Valley Road, the German Timber-Frame Road and the Road of Weser Renaissance. The valley is crossed by several railway lines at places like Hann. Münden, Wehrden (Weser), Höxter and Holzminden. From Hamelin the railway lines run parallel to the Weser via Bad Oeynhausen (Weser Railway) to Minden (Hamm–Minden railway).
 
A long section of the roughly 500 km long cycle path, the Weser Cycle Path runs mostly along the Weser through the Upper Weser Valley.

External links 
 BfN Weser Gorge fact file 
 BfN Holzminden Weser Valley fact file 
 BfN Rinteln-Hamelin Weser Valley 

Weser
Regions of Hesse
Valleys of Lower Saxony
Valleys of Hesse
Valleys of North Rhine-Westphalia